Current Reviews in Obstetrics and Gynaecology, also spelled Current Reviews in Obstetrics and Gynecology, is a book series on obstetrics and gynecology which was edited by Tom Lind, Albert Singer, and Joseph A. Jordan and was published by Churchill Livingstone in the 1980s. Its International Standard Serial Number (ISSN) is 0264-5610.

Volumes
 Volume 1: Obstetric Analgesia and Anaesthesia (Selwyn Crawford, 1982)
 Volume 2: Early Diagnosis of Fetal Defects (Brock, 1982)
 Volume 3: Early Teenage Pregnancy (Russell, 1982)
 Volume 4: Ovarian Malignancies: The Clinical Care of Adults and Adolescents (Piver & Scully, 1983)
 Volume 5: Cancer of the Cervix: Diagnosis and Treatment (Shingleton & Orr, 1983)
 Volume 6: Aspects of Care in Labour (Beazley & Lobb, 1983)
 Volume 7: Drug Prescribing in Pregnancy (Krauer, Krauer, & Hytten, 1984)
 Volume 8: Spontaneous Abortion (Huisjes, 1984)
 Volume 9: Female Puberty and Its Abnormalities (Dewhurst, 1984)
 Volume 10: Coagulation Problems During Pregnancy (Letsky, 1985)
 Volume 11: Infertility in the Male (Jequier, 1986)
 Volume 12: Endometriosis (O'Connor, 1987)
 Volume 13: Diabetic Pregnancy (Brudenell & Doddridge, 1989)

References

External links
 Current Reviews in Obstetrics & Gynaecology (0264-5610) - ISSN Portal
 Current Reviews in Obstetrics and Gynaecology - WorldCat Search

Book series introduced in the 1980s
Medical books
Series of non-fiction books